"Causing a Commotion" is a song by American singer Madonna from the soundtrack album to the 1987 film Who's That Girl. It was released as the album's second single on August 25, 1987 by Sire Records. Its Silver Screen Single Mix later appeared on the EP The Holiday Collection (1991). Written and produced by Madonna and Stephen Bray, the song was inspired by her relationship with then-husband Sean Penn, and his abusive and violent nature. Containing a dance-oriented, up-tempo groove, the song begins with the chorus and is accompanied by a four-note descending bassline and staccato chords in the verses.

Since its release, "Causing a Commotion" has received mixed reviews from music critics. The song was a commercial success, peaking within the top-ten in the United States, Australia, Canada, Ireland, New Zealand, Italy, Sweden and the United Kingdom, and topped the Billboard Dance Club Songs chart. Madonna performed the song on the Who's That Girl World Tour in 1987 – which was transmitted via satellite to the 1987 MTV Video Music Awards – and the Blond Ambition World Tour in 1990. The performances were included in the home video release of the tours.

Background and release 
In 1986, Madonna was shooting for her third motion picture Who's That Girl, known at the time as Slammer. Needing songs for the soundtrack of the movie, she contacted Patrick Leonard and Stephen Bray, with whom she had written and produced her third studio album True Blue (1986). The song was written and produced by Madonna and Bray for the film's soundtrack. It was inspired by her then husband Sean Penn and their often tumultuous relationship. Madonna felt that her marriage to Penn was on the verge of breaking up, due to Penn's abusive and violent nature. That translated as the inspiration behind the song. In a Rolling Stone article dated September 10, 1987, Madonna spoke about Penn's impact on her life,
"I don't like violence. I never condone hitting anyone, and I never thought that any violence should have taken place. But on the other hand, I understood Sean's anger and believe me, I have wanted to hit them [the paparazzi] many times. I never would, you know, because I realize that it would just make things worse. [...] I felt like he was 'Causing a Commotion' to purposefully distract me. I wrote this song and vented my frustration in it."
In the United States, "Causing a Commotion" was released on August 25, 1987. In the United Kingdom, the song was released on September 17, just after the conclusion of the Who's That Girl World Tour that same month. In 1991, the Silver Screen Single Mix of the song was included on the EP The Holiday Collection (1991).

Recording and composition 

"Causing a Commotion" was recorded and mixed by Stephen Bray along with Shep Pettibone, who also did additional production on the track. Junior Vasquez was the mixing engineer along with Steve Peck, the former also did the audio editing. Background vocals were provided by Donna De Lory and Niki Haris. "Causing a Commotion" has a dancey, up-tempo groove in it. The musical arrangement consists of a number of hooks interpolating with each other. It begins with the chorus, where Madonna sings the line "I've got the moves baby, You've got the motion, If we got together we'd be causing a commotion". The verses are accompanied by a four-note descending bassline and interjecting staccato chords.

The lyrics make reference to Madonna's 1985 hit single "Into the Groove" and have three parts to the vocal harmony. Andrzej Ciuk, one of the editors of the book Exploring Space noted that the proverbial status of the phrase "opposites attract" as a defining key ingredient of cultural concept of "love" and this was evident also in the song with the lyrics: "You met your match when you met me, I know that you'll disagree it's crazy, But opposites attract you'll see, And I won't let you get away so easy".

Critical reception 

"Causing a Commotion" received generally mixed to positive reviews from music critics. Rikky Rooksby, author of The Complete Guide to the Music of Madonna, said that the song was "Perfectly acceptable, though not in the same class as 'Who's That Girl'." Christian Wright from Spin called the song celebratory. Camille Paglia, one of the authors of The Madonna Companion: Two Decades of Commentary, said that Madonna's command of massive, resonant basslines impressed her. She wrote: "I recall my stunned admiration as I sat in the theater in 1987 and first experienced the crashing, descending chords of Madonna's 'Causing a Commotion', which opened her dreadful movie Who's That Girl. If you want to hear the essence of modernity, listen to those chords, infernal, apocalyptic and grossly sensual. This is the authentic voice of fin de siècle." Stephen Thomas Erlewine of AllMusic commented that "Causing a Commotion" and "Who's That Girl" were not among Madonna's best singles. Matthew Jacobs from HuffPost, placed it at number 46 of his list "The Definitive Ranking of Madonna Singles", calling it "cheerful, until you learn it was inspired by her abusive relationship with Sean Penn".

In August 2018, Billboard ranked it as Madonna's 85th greatest song; Joel Lynch wrote that only Madonna "could release a song this lightweight from a critically drubbed film and still take it to No. 2 on the Hot 100. The arresting, thick AF bass line and the sugary determination of her delivery make this a delight, albeit a relatively slight one". Slant Magazines Eric Henderson called it "somehow generic and diverting in equal measure, ['Causing a Commotion'] offers one of Madonna’s most undeniable come-on lines at the center of it all". Louis Virtel from The Backlot ranked it at number 16 on a list for "The 100 Greatest Madonna Songs", and called it "jubilant and driving". Writing for Gay Star News, Joe Morgan deemed it an "absolute gem" that "unfortunately sinks in the background when it comes to Madonna’s 80s classics". The Guardians Jude Rogers described it as "a slighter facsimile of the imperial 'Into the Groove', protesting too much about its abilities to coax out the noise police". For Medium's Richard LaBeau, "there is nothing especially bad about this track, but it is profoundly forgettable, particularly in comparison with the brilliant singles that preceded and followed it".

Chart performance 
"Causing a Commotion" debuted on the US Billboard Hot 100 at number 41 the week of September 12, 1987, as "Who's That Girl" was descending from the top-ten. The song quickly climbed up the chart, ultimately peaking at number two the week of October 24, 1987, blocked from the top position by Michael Jackson's "Bad" and Tiffany's "I Think We're Alone Now." It remained in the runner-up position for three consecutive weeks, before descending the chart. The song reached the top 40 of the Billboard Adult Contemporary chart and hit number one on the Dance Club Songs chart. In Canada, the song debuted at number 90 on the RPM Top 100 chart on September 19, 1987. After six weeks, the song reached a peak of number two on the chart. It was present for a total of 31 weeks and ranked at number 47 on the RPM year-end chart for 1987.

In the United Kingdom, "Causing a Commotion" entered the UK Singles Chart at number seven and peaked at number four. The song was present for a total of nine weeks. According to the Official Charts Company, the song has sold 230,000 copies there. In Germany, the song debuted on the Media Control Charts at number 66 on September 29, 1987, reaching a peak of number 14 in its third week and spending 12 weeks on the chart. The song reached the top-ten in Australia and the European Hot 100 Singles, peaking at number seven and three, respectively. Elsewhere, the song reached the top-ten in Belgium, Ireland, the Netherlands, New Zealand and Switzerland, and the top 20 in Austria, Norway and Sweden.

Live performances 

Madonna performed "Causing a Commotion" on the Who's That Girl World Tour and the Blond Ambition World Tour. On the Who's That Girl World Tour, "Causing a Commotion" was the sixth song of the set list. Collaborating with Marlene Stewart on the clothes for the tour, Madonna expanded on the idea of bringing her video characters to life and to display a gangster theme for the song. She wore a golden lamé jacket and performed the song while accompanied by two dancers, each holding a gun. Performances of the song on this tour can be found on the Who's That Girl: Live in Japan video, filmed in Tokyo, Japan, on June 22, 1987, and on the Ciao Italia: Live from Italy video, filmed in Turin, Italy, on September 4, 1987. The latter performance was transmitted via satellite to the 1987 MTV Video Music Awards.

On the Blond Ambition World Tour, "Causing a Commotion" was the third song of the set list. The outfit she wore for the performance was described by Carol Clerk, author of Madonnastyle,  as the "perfect visual combination of masculine and feminine". Madonna wore heavy makeup with thick, blackened eyebrows and heavy application of dark liner. The performance ended with Madonna wrestling with her female backup singers. Two different performances were released on video: the Blond Ambition Japan Tour 90, filmed in Yokohama, Japan, on April 27, 1990, and the Blond Ambition World Tour Live, filmed in Nice, France, on August 5, 1990.

Track listing and formats 

US 7" single
 "Causing a Commotion" (Silver Screen Single Mix) – 4:00
 "Jimmy Jimmy" (LP Version) – 3:54

UK 12" single
 "Causing a Commotion" (Silver Screen Mix) – 6:33
 "Causing a Commotion" (Movie House Mix) – 9:40
 "Jimmy Jimmy" (Fade) – 3:39

US 12" Maxi-Single
 "Causing a Commotion" (Silver Screen Mix) – 6:33
 "Causing a Commotion" (Dub) – 7:04
 "Causing a Commotion" (Movie House Mix) – 9:40
 "Jimmy Jimmy" (LP Version) – 3:54

Germany / UK Reissue CD Maxi-Single (1995)
 "Causing a Commotion" (Silver Screen Mix) – 6:33
 "Causing a Commotion" (Dub) – 7:04
 "Causing a Commotion" (Movie House Mix) – 9:40
 "Jimmy Jimmy" (LP Version) – 3:54

Credits and personnel 
 Madonna – vocals, writer, producer
 Stephen Bray – writer, producer, audio mixing
 Shep Pettibone – audio mixing, additional production
 Junior Vasquez – mixing engineer, audio editing
 Steve Peck – mixing engineer
 Jane O'Neal – photography
 Jeri Heiden – art direction
 Maura P. McLaughlin – design

Credits adapted from the Who's That Girl soundtrack and 12" single liner notes.

Charts

Weekly charts

Year-end charts

See also 
List of number-one dance singles of 1987 (U.S.)
List of Madonna tribute albums

Notes

References

External links
 "Causing a Commotion" on Spotify
 "Causing a Commotion" (remastered) on Spotify

1987 singles
1987 songs
Madonna songs
Sire Records singles
Songs written for films
Songs written by Madonna
Songs written by Stephen Bray
Song recordings produced by Madonna
Song recordings produced by Stephen Bray